Guillaume Bijl (born 1946 in Antwerp) is a Belgian conceptual and an installation artist. He lives and works in Antwerp.

Early life and Education
Bijl was born in 1946 to a working-class family in Antwerp. The artist's father worked at the local docks and his mother worked for the Bell Telephone Company. A self-taught artist, Bijl came to art as an outsider initially making paintings during the 1960s. During this time, he mimicked numerous artistic movements such as Impressionism, Expressionism, Surrealism, abstract movements and more. During a period of self-guided studies in economics, Bijl worked at a bank in Brussels. Shortly thereafter his parents sent him to a local vocational trade school in the hopes of gaining professional skills. For nearly a decade, Bijl worked part-time in the art section of a bookstore in Antwerp. In the late 1960s, he studied theater and film at the Royal Institute for Theatre, Cinema, and Sound in Brussels before dropping out after only a year. Bijl only then devoted himself to art-making full-time in his mid-30s.

Work
Bijl's early work, a series of projects on paper, combined his myriad background experiences and aimed to engage a wider audience citing a need to be nearer to the public. The series, Project-notities [Project Notes] (1969–1975), includes drawings and written proposals for museum installations, theatrical pieces, performance projects, and experiments in 16mm film. In the late 1970s Bijl began creating Transformation Installations, meticulous imitations of everyday realities inside the walls of galleries and museums. Bijl's first installation was a driving school, set in a gallery in Antwerp in 1979, accompanied by a manifesto calling for the abolition of art centres, and replacing them with 'socially useful  institutions'. This installation was followed in the eighties by a billiards room, a casino, a laundromat, a centre for professional training, a psychiatric hospital,  a fallout shelter, a show of fictitious American artists, a conference for a new political party and a rural Belgian model house. A more recent show was at the Berlin’s Center for Opinions in Music and Art. Bijl has been reviewed by The New York Times. He divides his work  into four categories: 'Transformation Installations', 'Situation Installations', 'Compositions Trouvées' and 'Sorrys'.

Solo exhibitions 
Guillaume Bijl is represented by At the Gallery/modern and contemporary art (Antwerp), Galerie Nagel Draxler (Cologne/Berlin), Guy Pieters Gallery (Knokke-Heist, Belgium) and André Simoens Gallery (Knokke, Belgium). Below is a selection of Solo exhibitions:

 2012:  Cultuurcentrum Mechelen
 2012:  Etablisssement d’en face, Brussels
 2011:  Arnolfini
 2008:  SMAK
 2001:  Städtische galerie Nordhorn
 1998: Kunsthalle Reklinghausen
 1998: Neue Galerie Graz
 1997: Musée d'art contemporain de Montréal
 1996: Kunstverein Hannover
 1996: Muhka
 1994: Middelheim Open Air Sculpture Museum
 1993: Wiener Secession
 1990: Witte de With Center for Contemporary Art
 1989: New Museum
 1989: Le Magasin
 1988: Venice Biennale, Belgium Pavilion 
 1988: Kunstverein Kassel
 1986: Kunstverein Keulen
 1985: Stedelijk Museum
 1984: SMAK
 1984: Art Basel
 1979: Galerij Z, Antwerp

Group exhibitions 

Guillaume Bijl's work has been featured in significant groupshows and biennials, including the Documenta IX (1992), Skulptur Projekte Münster (2007), Busan Biennale (2006), Scape Biennale (2008), Lyon Biennale (2011), Istanbul Biennale (2013) and MANIFESTA 11 (2016).

Public collections
Bijl's piece titled Behandlingen (1975–1979) resides in the collection at the Museum of Contemporary Art, Antwerp. The artist has work collected at Centre Pompidou and Musée Nationale d'Art Moderne in Paris, the Stedelijk Museum voor Actuele Kunst (S.M.A.K.) in Ghent, MUMOK in Vienna, the Goldberg Collection in New York, and more.

References

External links
 Guillaume Bijl Official Website
 M HKA
 the-artist.org
 Guillaume Bijl at Franklin Furnace 

Living people
Artists from Antwerp
Belgian contemporary artists
Postmodern artists
Belgian installation artists
1946 births